Riverview is the name of three places in the State of Missouri in the United States of America:
 Riverview, Morgan County, Missouri 
 Riverview, St. Louis County, Missouri
 Riverview, St. Louis, a neighborhood of the City of St. Louis